Chabert is a French surname. Notable people with the surname include:

Alfred Chabert (1836–1916), French botanist
Lacey Chabert (born 1982), American actress and voice actress
Norby Chabert (born 1976), American politician
Théodore Chabert (1758–1845), French general of the French Revolutionary Wars and Napoleonic Wars
Philibert Chabert (1737–1814), French agronomist and veterinarian

See also
Le Colonel Chabert (disambiguation)
Daniel-Marie Chabert de Joncaire de Clausonne
Louis-Thomas Chabert de Joncaire
Philippe-Thomas Chabert de Joncaire

French-language surnames